No Other Name is the 23rd worship album by Hillsong released on 1 July 2014. This live album is named after the 2014 Hillsong Conference. The recording team for this album includes Reuben Morgan, Ben Fielding, Annie Garratt, Jad Gillies, David Ware, Jay Cook, Joel Houston, Matt Crocker, Taya Smith, Hannah Hobbs and Marty Sampson, among others.

The album peaked at No. 2 on the ARIA Albums Chart and has since been certified gold by the Australian Recording Industry Association for sales exceeding 35,000 copies.  In the United States, the album has sold 61,000 copies as of September 2015.  Both "This I Believe (The Creed)" and "Broken Vessels (Amazing Grace)" have charted into the Christian sect of iTunes top 40. Although "This I Believe (The Creed)" wasn't released as a single, it has received radio airplay.

History 

On February, Hillsong Worship through their page announced that they are working and recording a new album to be released for July 2014, and some of those songs include "This I Believe" and "Calvary".

In March they announced that they are working on the cover of the new album, joking that they didn't even know the name of it at all.

On 3 April, they released the album's first single, a song titled "Calvary" as an Easter single. Then, on 23 April, Cass Langton of Hillsong Church, posted a blog on Hillsong Collected, in which she talks about the new recording, announcing that Michael Chislett was producing the album. Meanwhile, Jay Argaet shot the new album cover on 23 April in Times Square, NYC.

On 5 May, they revealed the album name by posting the cover artwork of the album, which is a picture Times Square screens showing the text, "No Other Name, Jesus".

Recording 

The album recording started on February. While, the live DVD has been recorded at the Allphones Arena on Hillsong Conference 2014.

Awards and accolades
This album was No. 2 on the Worship Leader'''s Top 20 Albums of 2014 list.

The song, "This I Believe (The Creed)", was No. 2 on the Worship Leader'''s Top 20 Songs of 2014 list.

Track listing

Singles 

"Calvary" was the first single and was released on 3 April 2014 on their website. An acoustic, pre-release version of the song, sung by Reuben Morgan, was made available for free download.

"No Other Name" was released on 11 July 2014 on Christian FM stations.

Chart positions and reception

Weekly

Year-end

Certifications

References 

Hillsong Music live albums
Hillsong Music albums
2014 albums